Melilla is an exclave of Spain in North Africa.

Melilla may also refer to:
 Melilla (Congress of Deputies constituency)
 Melilla (Senate constituency)
 Melilla (Santurce), Puerto Rico
 Lezica-Melilla, rural area of Montevideo Department, Uruguay

See also
 Mellilla, a genus of moths
 Mellilä, in Finland
 Mellila, Morocco
 Melila, India